Southern Comfort is the second compilation album by American singer Anthony Hamilton. It was released on April 3, 2007, by Merovingian Music. The album consists of previously unreleased tracks written and recorded by Hamilton between 2000 and 2002, before the release of his debut studio album, Comin' from Where I'm From—similarly to 2005's Soulife. It debuted and peaked at number 90 on the Billboard 200, while reaching number 13 on the Top R&B/Hip-Hop Albums chart and number three on the Top Independent Albums chart. It was Hamilton's first album to have a Parental Advisory label.

Track listing
Writing credits adapted from BMI.

Charts

Release history

References

External links
 Southern Comfort microsite

2007 compilation albums
Anthony Hamilton (musician) albums